Novoye is a rural locality (a selo) in Ilyinskoye Rural Settlement, Kolchuginsky District, Vladimir Oblast, Russia. The population was 17 as of 2010.

Geography 
Novoye is located 13 km north of Kolchugino (the district's administrative centre) by road. Ilyinskoye is the nearest rural locality.

References 

Rural localities in Kolchuginsky District